Rod Jones may refer to:
Rod Jones (author) (born 1953), Australian author
Rod Jones (cornerback) (born 1964), American football cornerback in the National Football League
Rod Jones (offensive lineman) (born 1974), American football tackle in the National Football League
Rod Jones (tight end) (1964-2018), former professional American football tight end
Rod Jones (English footballer) (born 1945), goalkeeper for Rotherham United, Burnley and others
Rod Jones (Welsh footballer) (born 1946), Welsh footballer known also known as 'Roddy'
Rod Jones (musician) (born 1976), guitarist with the band Idlewild

Roddy Jones (born 1944), British Olympic swimmer

See also
Rodney Jones (disambiguation)
Roderick Jones (disambiguation)